Terry Lewis Coleman (born December 5, 1943) is an American politician from the state of Georgia.

Political career
Terry Coleman is a former member of Georgia General Assembly and speaker of the house. First elected to the Georgia House of Representatives in 1972, he chaired many House Committees and was elected as the Speaker of the House for the 2003-2004 Legislative Session. He served as Assistant Commissioner for the Georgia Department of Agriculture under Tommy Irvin from 2007-2010, when he stepped down to run for Commissioner of the Georgia Department of Labor.

Personal life
Born and raised in Dodge County, Coleman graduated from Dodge County High School in 1961.  From there, he went on to attend Reinhardt College where he earned an associate degree.  He later obtained his Bachelor of Science in Criminal Justice before obtaining his Juris Doctor from the Woodrow Wilson College of Law. He is currently employed by Coleman and Company Benefits, Inc. which deals with business insurance.  He has also been a member of the Eastman Volunteer Fire Department for the past 23 years. As Speaker of the House he cast the deciding vote to allow Georgians the opportunity to vote for the state flag of their choice.

His community involvement includes membership on the Board of Directors for the Bank of Dodge County and the Colony Bank Corporation.  He served on the Mercer medical School Board of Governors from 1990–2002, and was a President of the Chamber of Commerce from 1985-1987. He continues to play an active role in the Huddle House Franchise in Eastman and McRae-Helena, Georgia.  Representative Coleman is married to Carol Cofield Coleman; they have 2 children and 3 grandchildren.  He is a member of the First Methodist Church of Eastman.

See also
 List of speakers of the Georgia House of Representatives

References

|-

|-

|-

|-

|-

1943 births
Living people
People from Dodge County, Georgia
Reinhardt University alumni
21st-century American politicians
Speakers of the Georgia House of Representatives
Democratic Party members of the Georgia House of Representatives
Georgia (U.S. state) lawyers